In taxonomy, Methanothermococcus is a genus of the Methanococcaceae. The cells are shaped like irregular bars and tend to be Gram-negative.  They are mobile via polar flagella.  They require acetate to grow.

References

Further reading

Scientific journals

Scientific books

Scientific databases

External links

Archaea genera
Euryarchaeota